Jeff D. Cook (born April 18, 1961) is an American professional golfer.

Cook was born in Muncie, Indiana. He played college golf at Indiana University and turned professional in 1987.

Cook played on the PGA Tour and Nationwide Tour from 1990 to 2000. On the Nationwide Tour (1990–92, 1994–95, 1997, 2000), he won the 1990 Ben Hogan Greater Ozarks Open. On the PGA Tour (1993), his best finish was T-17 at the 1993 Anheuser-Busch Golf Classic. He also won the Indiana Open four times between 1986 and 1992.

Cook currently works for Mizuno Golf.

Professional wins (5)

Ben Hogan Tour wins (1)

Ben Hogan Tour playoff record (1–0)

Other wins (4)
1986 Indiana Open
1988 Indiana Open
1989 Indiana Open
1992 Indiana Open

See also
1992 PGA Tour Qualifying School graduates

References

External links

American male golfers
Indiana Hoosiers men's golfers
PGA Tour golfers
Golfers from Indiana
Sportspeople from Muncie, Indiana
1961 births
Living people